Cocompact may refer to:
 Cocompact group action
 Cocompact Coxeter group
 Cocompact embedding
 Cocompact lattice